Robert Lous Olin (July 4, 1908 – December 16, 1956) was an American boxer who became the World Light Heavyweight champion on November 16, 1934, against Maxie Rosenbloom at Madison Square Garden.  He was trained by Ray Arcel and managed by Harold Scadron.

Early life and career
Olin was born on July 4, 1908, to a Jewish family in New York's crowded Lower East Side, and raised in Brooklyn. Like several outstanding Jewish boxers of his era, he began boxing at the Lower East Side's Educational Alliance on East Broadway, a settlement house for Jewish immigrants from Eastern Europe. After graduating from Erasmus High, he attended Fordham Law School for two years while working as a messenger for a Wall Street brokerage office.  Early in his boxing career, Olin continued to broker the sale of bonds as a side line.

Boxing as an amateur, Olin won the New York City Golden Gloves Light Heavyweight  Open Championship in 1928.  On March 24, 1928, he competed in the Inter-City Golden Gloves Competition in Chicago.  He won all 35 of his amateur fights, as well as the New York Metropolitan Amateur Athletic Union title, and turned professional in 1929.

Early career 1930-31
On April 10, 1930, Olin defeated George LaRocco in a six-round points decision at Lennox Sporting Club in New York.
	
On June 3, 1930, Olin met Ralph Ficucello, a former 1929 New York Golden Gloves Heavyweight Champion, at Queensboro Stadium in Queens, New York. Though outweighed by 12 pounds, Olin pulled off the victory of the fellow Golden Gloves champion in an eight-round points decision.

On October 22, 1930, Olin bested Willard Dix in a hard-fought ten round points decision at New York's Madison Square Garden.  Olin floored Dix for a nine count in the fourth and ninth rounds. In the rough match, Olin was down for nine in the fourth himself.

Olin took a ten-round decision against Joe Banovic near the end of 1930 at Madison Square Garden. It was a dull, close, mauling bout with little boxing or long range blows, and the decision was unpopular with many fans, but Banovic was an accomplished opponent and the win helped pave Olin's path toward a light heavyweight championship attempt

On July 27, 1931, Olin defeated Al Gainer, a determined World Light Heavyweight Championship contender, in a ten-round bout at White City Stadium in New Haven, Connecticut.  Gainer led in the early rounds, but Olin came through in the ninth and tenth to win the referee's decision.  A light rain hampered the outdoor match in the fifth and sixth rounds.  From his corner, trainer Ray Arcel assisted Olin in the strategically fought bout.

1931 NBA Light Heavy tournament
On December 18, 1931, Olin achieved a fourth-round knockout of Tait Littman in the opening round of the National Boxing Association World Light Heavyweight Tournament at Chicago Stadium.  Olin's telling blow was a left hook delivered with Littman against the ropes.  Twelve days later in the tournament's second round on December 30, Olin won over Cylde Chastain in a ten-round split decision. Though many in the crowd believed Chastain had outboxed Olin in the opening rounds, Olin was awarded the decision due to his strong finish in the closing rounds.  In his final round of the tournament, Olin lost a ten-round decision to Baxter Calmes on January 15, 1932.

Lead up to the Light Heavy title, 1933-34
On February 15, 1932, at New York's St. Nicholas Arena Olin broke his right hand placing three smashing rights to the jaw of Arthur Hittick in the first, and he lost the bout as a result.  Though he managed to finish the bout, he was unable to use his right hand for uppercuts or to block as effectively, and Hittick countered with blows to the body in the remaining rounds.

Al Gainer handed Olin a disappointing loss in their third meeting on September 1, 1932, in a ten-round points decision at West Haven, Connecticut.  Gainer gave Olin a "terrific battering during the last two rounds".  Gainer was an aspiring Light Heavyweight Contender and a Connecticut State Light Heavyweight Champion with a strong punch and may have outpowered the lighter punching Olin this match.  Regardless, Olin won in two of their four meetings and drew one.  The battle was close until the ninth when a barrage of punches by Gainer left Olin nearly helpless, and with cuts below both eyes.

Olin took a six-round points decision on October 9, 1933, at Madison Square Garden against Black boxer Ed "Unknown" Winston.  A right cross to the head sent Winston to the deck for a no count in the first, and he connected with fewer punches than he received in the rough rounds that followed.
 	
On November 17, 1933, Olin just managed to win the decision in a hard-fought eight round bout with Charley Massera at Madison Square Garden.  There were no knockdowns in the close match, but the close victory bolstered Olin's confidence after he failed to win the NBA Light Heavyweight Tournament.

Olin lost to Lou Brouillard, former National Boxing Association World Welterweight Champion, on January 19, 1934, in a ten-round split decision in New York's Madison Square Garden.  Broulliard had lost his World Welterweight Title only a few months before meeting Olin, yet a depression era crowd of only 4,000 saw the bout at the Garden.  Brouillard lost the second and fourth rounds from low blow fouls, but in the remaining rounds, he took the offensive and Olin had to hold or back away at times to remain in the fight.  Late in the eighth, Olin scored with a few smashes to the head of Brouillard that only made Brouillard's fight harder in the following round.  In the ninth, Olin was nearly doubled over from Brouilard's powerful blows to the body.  In the close decision, Judge Jack Britton, former Welterweight Champion, dissented from the other judge and referee, and cast the only score sheet for Olin.  On April 5, Olin lost to Brouillard for a final time in a ten-round points decision at the Arena in New Haven, Connecticut.

On May 25, 1934, Olin scored a TKO against Bob Godwin 50 seconds into the first round at Legion Stadium in Hollywood.  Olin charged to the middle of the ring, and landed a left hook to the chin of Godwin only five seconds into the bout, immediately dropping him for a no count. Olin briefly floored him again after he arose.  Godwin resumed fighting only to face a two fisted assault from Olin against the ropes that sank him to the canvas for the final time for a count of seven.  After Godwin tentatively struggled to his feet, the referee stopped the bout.  The win helped Olin recover his confidence from his losses to Brouillard.

World Light Heavy title, 1934
On November 16, 1934, he won the New York State Athletic Commission (NYSAC's) World Light Heavyweight championship in a listless, fifteen-round match before a modest crowd of 7300 from Maxie Rosenbloom at New York's famed Madison Square Garden. After fifteen dull rounds, Olin won the decision to an opponent who many ringside believed was totally disinterested in maintaining his title. A small amount of contact in the first round probably gave the points advantage to Rosenbloom, particularly since Olin was called for a low blow. Though there was limited real fighting in the first thirteen rounds, Olin was responsible for most of it, usually going to the body of his opponent. Rosenbloom was on the defensive until the last two or three rounds, when he opened up with a few brief slugging attacks. Both judges agreed with the verdict for Olin giving no more than four rounds to his opponent, but the referee sided for Rosenbloom, giving him eight rounds in the close match. The United Press added to the dissent from the boxing public by going against the official ruling, giving ten rounds to Rosenbloom, only four to Olin, with one even.  The dullness of the bout caused some fans to suspect a fix, but the suspicion was never proven.

Boxing as Light Heavyweight Champion, Olin humbled Henry Firpo in a third-round knockout at the Convention Hall in Asbury Park, New Jersey on September 20, 1935.  Firpo was unable to mount a defense against Olin's consistent blows to the body which nearly downed him by the end of the second round, though he was saved by the bell.  He answered the third round's opening bell, but went down for the count with another harsh round of body blows from Olin.  Firpo had been an unsuccessful participant in the November 1931, NBA Middleweight Championship elimination tournament in Milwaukee, though he won his first two rounds.

Loss of Light Heavy title, 1935
Olin lost his title to John Henry Lewis on October 31, 1935, in a fifteen-round unanimous decision at the Arena in St. Louis. Due to the depression and a lack of interest in the Light Heavyweight class, Olin's manager had a difficult time finding a promoter or an audience for the fight, finally settling on a payment of $15,000 to fight Lewis in St. Louis.  The meager audience of 9,219 that showed on fight day could not provide enough in receipts to pay Olin half of what he was promised.

Olin's trainer Ray Arcel later wrote that Olin lost his nerve to fight Lewis the week before and had to be encouraged to change his mind up to the day of the match.  His motivation may have temporarily been affected when he learned on fight day he would receive less than half of his promised purse.  The fight, however, was spectacular, with Olin showing gameness throughout the fifteen rounds, though clearly outmatched by Lewis and taking a beating. Many in the crowd urged the referee to end the fight in the twelfth round, but Olin fought on.  In his typical style, he came out charging and won the first two rounds with a significant margin in points.  In the third, finding his range, Lewis battered Olin with precision lefts to the head and straight rights to the body.   Both boxers punched with precision and skill, until the thirteenth when Lewis, struggling for a knockout, inadvertently struck Olin after the bell sounded.  Faced with the "machine-like precision" of Lewis, Olin lost twelve rounds, while managing to keep two even. Olin, with the will of a former champion, courageously remained on his feet through the entire fifteen rounds, refusing to suffer a knockdown.

Following his title loss to Lewis, Olin lost to French boxer Al McCoy on December 10, 1935, in a crushing ten round points decision at the Forum in Montreal, Canada.  Olin suffered severely at the hands of McCoy, with a barrage of blows to the body and head.  He performed well in the opening rounds, but by the final two, he was reeling about the ring, and nearly out on his feet from the brutal attack of McCoy. 
	 
In one of his better late career matches as a fringe Heavyweight contender on April 2, 1936, Olin lost to Tommy Farr at Royal Albert Hall in Kensington, England in a fifteen-round points decision. His manager, and many in the crowd protested the decision, as Olin had knocked Farr to the mat twice for counts.

On January 15, 1937, Olin lost to black boxer Tiger Fox, Spokane native, in a second-round TKO at the Armory in Spokane, Washington. Olin took vicious blows to his head in the two round bout, and received a deep gash under his right eye, later requiring six stitches to close.  This bruising defeat, his previous defeat to Canadian Al McCoy, and the bruising knockdowns he would suffer in his crushing rematch with Lewis the following June, likely accelerated his retirement from the ring, and robbed him of his ability to cope with top contenders.

Attempt to regain title, 1937
In a rematch for the title with Lewis on June 3, 1937, Olin failed to regain the title, losing in an eighth-round TKO, before another small crowd of 12,000.   Probably showing the wear of his years in the ring, he appeared more sluggish and lacked the speed he had shown in their former meeting.  Suffering a broken rib on his left side early in the second round, Olin could not maintain his defense.  He was on the mat for a count of nine from a right to the body in the fourth. In the sixth, Olin started the round with a few blows that had little effect on his opponent. In the eighth, Lewis put Olin to the floor again with blows to his ribs for a count of seven before he could rise and resume the match.  Immediately after a right hand sent Olin to the floor again, the referee raised the hand of Lewis to end the fight.  Olin received only $3,000 for his efforts, but was compensated an additional $1,800 by Lewis, who had promised him the rematch after their previous title fight.

Declining boxing years
Olin won a decisive victory over Patsy Perroni on September 13, 1937, in a third-round technical knockout at the Convention Hall in Toldedo, Ohio.  A sweeping left from Olin broke Perroni's jaw early in the third, and he was unable to resume the fight at the fourth round bell.  It was the first knockout of Perroni's career.

On September 28, 1937, Olin lost a sixth-round TKO to Leroy Haynes at Convention Hall in Philadelphia due to a cut eye which was bleeding.   The contest was a semi-final bout before a crowd of 9,000.  In frustration with the ruling to end the hard-fought bout, and perhaps sensing the end of his boxing career from his recent losses, in an atypical breach of boxing etiquette Olin struggled with the referee to change the ruling.  Olin's handlers were required to step in and separate the two men.  His boxing record would make a distinct downturn after this bout, losing five of his remaining seven bouts.

Before a crowd of 4,200, on November 17, 1937, Olin lost to Johnny Risko, a respected heavyweight contender, in a ten-round points decision that showcased Risko's command of infighting.  Risko was on the comeback trail after two years away from the ring, and was eager to demonstrate his dominance over the former champion.  He effectively blocked the blows of Olin, who was beginning to show wear from several recent losses.  The Associated Press gave Risko seven of the ten rounds with Olin taking the sixth and seventh, and the fourth remaining even.

Later life
After eleven years of boxing, Olin retired from the ring in 1939, never attempting a comeback.  In 1942, he enlisted in the Coast Guard and served in WWII.  After returning from his service, he resumed his prior career working for a Wall Street brokerage.

Olin opened up his own restaurant in 1946 at 128 West 58th Street in New York but had to close it and another restaurant for lack of business.  He gained far greater success and a bit of local fame when he moved his restaurant to Central Park West and 61st Street and renamed it "Bob Olin's on the Park".

In 1951, he was diagnosed with a heart ailment, and hospitalized once in his mid-40s.  On December 16, 1956, at age 48, he died of a heart attack while driving a date to her home in the Bronx.  He was married once and divorced, but left no children.

Professional boxing record

See also
List of light heavyweight boxing champions
List of select Jewish boxers

References

External links
Cyber Boxing Zone bio
Boxrec bio
 

1908 births
1956 deaths
Boxers from New York City
Light-heavyweight boxers
Jewish American boxers
Jewish boxers
World light-heavyweight boxing champions
World boxing champions
American male boxers
20th-century American Jews